Consort Place, formerly known as Alpha Square, is a mixed-use development approved for the Isle of Dogs, London, just south of the financial district Canary Wharf.

Original plans for the development were withdrawn by the developer in 2015 following a recommendation to refuse the scheme by Tower Hamlets Development Committee. Revised plans were submitted in 2015 which were rejected by Tower Hamlets Council in February 2016. The then Mayor of London Boris Johnson called in the scheme in early 2016 which gave him the authority to reject or allow the proposals. It was approved on 27 April 2016.

The development includes three towers, 634 homes, a hotel, school and health centre. The main private residential building is called Aspen.

Gallery

See also 
List of tallest buildings and structures in London

References 

Canary Wharf buildings
Proposed skyscrapers in London
Millwall
Proposed skyscrapers in England
Proposed skyscrapers in the United Kingdom